Mart Kivastik (born 4 March 1963 in Tartu) is an Estonian film director and scenarist.

1981-1991 he worked as an editor in Tallinnfilm. Since 1991 he is a freelance writer.

Filmography
 1997 "E2-E4" (feature film; scenarist) 	
 2008 "Taarka" (feature film; scenarist)	
 2009 "Vasha" (feature film; scenarist)	
 2011 "Üks mu sõber" (feature film; director and scenarist)	
 2016 "Õnn tuleb magades" (feature film; director and scenarist)

References

Living people
1963 births
Estonian film directors
Estonian screenwriters